Louis Lazerus Goldstein (March 14, 1913 – July 3, 1998) served as comptroller, or chief financial officer, of Maryland for ten terms from 1959 to 1998. A popular politician and lifelong Democrat, he was first elected to the Maryland House of Delegates in 1938 and served three terms in the Maryland Senate before winning election as Comptroller. He ran unsuccessfully for U. S. Senate in 1964.

Early life
Goldstein was born in Prince Frederick, Maryland in Calvert County. His father Goodman Goldstein was a Jewish immigrant from Prussia who had settled in the rural area after he was assigned as a salesman to Calvert County by his first employer, a Baltimore retailer. Louis worked in his father's store in Prince Frederick until he left to attend Washington College in Chestertown, Maryland and later the University of Maryland, where he received his law degree in 1938. He was elected that year to the Maryland House of Delegates as a Democrat from Calvert County. Goldstein enlisted in the United States Marine Corps at the age of 29 following the Pearl Harbor attack and served in the Pacific. Commissioned as an officer from enlisted rank he reached 1st lieutenant. Following the surrender of Japan he was a member of General Douglas MacArthur's staff that investigated Japanese war crimes in the Philippines.

Political career
Returning to politics in 1946 Goldstein was elected to the Maryland Senate for the first of three terms. In the Senate he was majority leader from 1951 to 1955 and President of the Senate from 1955 to 1958. In 1959 he was elected to the first of ten terms as Comptroller of Maryland. The politically powerful position entails membership on the Public Works Board with the governor and state treasurer, granting final authority over most state contracts and purchases. Goldstein ran for the United States Senate in 1964, losing in the Democratic primary to eventual Senator Joseph Tydings.

Family
Some of this land was sold in 1967 to Baltimore Gas and Electric for the Calvert Cliffs Nuclear Power Plant at above-market prices, prompting criticism. Goldstein married lawyer Hazel Horton in 1948, with whom he practiced law. They had two daughters and a son. Hazel died in 1996. Goldstein died at their Calvert County home, Oakland Park, on July 3, 1998, of an apparent heart attack.

Political legacy

Goldstein served as a legislator in the General Assembly of Maryland, and allegedly also owned land in every county in the State of Maryland. He practiced law with his wife Hazel (1917–1996). The statue of Louis L. Goldstein, outside the Louis L. Goldstein Treasury Building in the state capital of Annapolis, was created by Jay Hall Carpenter and unveiled on April 3, 2002.

Goldstein Hall at his alma mater Washington College is named for him. The "Goldstein Award" at the college's annual commencement awards the graduate with the greatest potential for success in public service. All of Maryland Route 2/4 in Calvert County is named after Goldstein.

The Calvert County Democratic Party's annual dinner banquet is also named after Louis L. Goldstein. Goldstein deputy, Robert L. "Bobby" Swann was appointed Comptroller after Goldstein's death by then-governor Parris Glendening. Former four-term Mayor of Baltimore and two-term Governor William Donald Schaefer later ran for the office of Comptroller in November 1998. Goldstein had already announced he was running for another term before his death and would have almost certainly been re-elected even at age 85. Schaefer, tired of being out of public office, and still popular with a wide support among the electorate, won easily following Goldstein's death.
Ironically, Schaefer and Goldstein sat on the Maryland Board of Public Works together when Goldstein was comptroller and Schaefer was governor. The two were not particularly close personally or professionally, although Goldstein was almost always gracious but tough at BPW meetings. Longtime Maryland Senate President Thomas V. (Mike) Miller, Jr., considers Goldstein one of the greatest politicians he has ever known. Goldstein rarely forgot a name or at least a face.

His Annapolis office was taken apart piece-by-piece after his death at the guidance of his longtime friend and deputy comptroller, Swann, and was replicated at the Jefferson Patterson Park and Museum located in St. Leonard, Maryland.

Quotes
"God bless y'all real good."

References

External links

Maryland Archives biography

1913 births
1998 deaths
20th-century American Jews
20th-century American politicians
American chief financial officers
Comptrollers of Maryland
Jewish American military personnel
Jewish American state legislators in Maryland
People from Prince Frederick, Maryland
Presidents of the Maryland State Senate
Democratic Party Maryland state senators
United States Marine Corps officers
United States Marine Corps personnel of World War II
Washington College alumni